Howard is a census-designated place (CDP) and post office in and governed by Fremont County, Colorado, United States. The CDP is a part of the Cañon City, CO Micropolitan Statistical Area. The Howard post office has the ZIP Code 81233. At the United States Census 2010, the population of the Howard CDP was 723, while the population of the 81233 ZIP Code Tabulation Area was 823 including adjacent areas.

History
The Howard Post Office has been in operation since 1882. The community has the name of John Howard, a local pioneer.

Geography
Howard is located in southwestern Fremont County, not far from the geographic center, or precise east-west, north-south middle point of Colorado. U.S. Route 50 passes through the CDP, leading northwest  to Salida and east  to Cañon City, the Fremont County seat. Howard is bordered to the southeast by Coaldale.

The CDP boundaries extend southwest from the Arkansas River Valley up the eastern slopes of the Sangre de Cristo Range within San Isabel National Forest.

Demographics

See also

 List of census-designated places in Colorado

References

External links

 Howard @ Colorado.com
 Howard, Colorado Mining Claims And Mines
 Fremont County website

Census-designated places in Fremont County, Colorado
Census-designated places in Colorado
Colorado populated places on the Arkansas River